HIstome is a database that provides information about human histone proteins, their sites of modifications, variants and modifying enzymes, and diseases linked to histone modifications.

Update
HISTome2 is a updated version of the HIstome database released in 2020.

See also
 Histone

References

External links
 http://www.iiserpune.ac.in/~coee/histome/

Biological databases
Epigenetics